USS Fern was originally a lighthouse tender built in 1871 by Delameter and Stack of New York City. She was transferred to the United States Navy from the United States Treasury Department on 30 January 1891. Fitted out as a gunboat, Fern was commissioned on 22 April 1891, with Lieutenant Commander A. J. Iverson in command.

Service history
Fern sailed the east coast, carrying coal and general cargo to various bases, locating and destroying by gunfire wrecks of ships obstructing navigation, and assisting in the precommissioning trials of new ships. After 22 January 1898, she was based at Key West, Florida to carry mail and supplies to the increasing number of ships which concentrated in the Caribbean as war with Spain threatened. When war began in April, Fern continued her runs from Key West to the squadron off Santiago, Cuba and to Guantánamo Bay. During the Battle of Santiago de Cuba on 3 July, the ship was commanded by Herbert Winslow.

On 16 October, Fern was transferred to the District of Columbia Naval Militia and decommissioned on 22 October. In 1904–1905, she was laid up at Norfolk, Virginia, then repaired at Detroit for duty with the Minnesota Naval Militia in Duluth, Minnesota. She was renamed Gopher on 27 December 1905.

With U.S. entry into World War I, Gopher was assigned duty as a practice ship at the Great Lakes Naval Training Station, and on 30 May 1917 was returned to commission. She trained members of the Naval Reserve at ports in the 9th Naval District, principally Chicago, until she was placed out of commission on 19 April 1919.

Gopher was recommissioned on 15 May 1921 for service with the U.S. Naval Reserve at Toledo, Ohio. On 1 October 1922, she was placed in reduced commission, and on 5 August departed for Boston. While in passage, she rammed and damaged a lock in the Soulanges Canal and was apprehended and held by the Canadian Government at Quebec. Gopher was later decommissioned as of the date of her sinking.

References

Bibliography  
 United States Government (1888). Nineteenth Annual List of Merchant Vessels of the United States. p. 417. 
 U.S. Department of Commerce (1919). Fifty-first Annual List of Merchant Vessels of the United States. p. 484. 

Gunboats of the United States Navy
Ships built in New York City
1871 ships
Lighthouse tenders of the United States